The 2020 Chinese Women's Football League, officially known as the 2020 China Taiping Chinese Football Association Women's Football League for sponsorship reasons, was the 6th season in its current incarnation. In this season, all matches were held at Jiangning Football Training Base, Nanjing, Jiangsu. The season began on 12 September 2020 and concluded on 3 October 2020. In this season, the number of clubs was reduced from 10 to 7.

Clubs

Club changes

To Football League
Clubs promoted from 2019 Chinese Women's League Two
 Dalian Pro
 Guangzhou Evergrande Taobao
 Shanghai Greenland Shenhua

From Football League
Clubs promoted to 2020 Chinese Women's Super League
 Hebei China Fortune
 Shandong Sports Lottery
 Zhejiang

Clubs relegated to 2020 Chinese Women's League Two
 Donghua University

Dissolved entries
 Hebei Aoli Jingying

Choose not to enter
 PLA

Stadiums and locations

League table

Results

Positions by round

Results by match played

Goalscorers

References

External links
Official Website (Desktop view)
Official Website (Mobile view)

2020
2019–20 domestic women's association football leagues
2020–21 domestic women's association football leagues
+